"We Can Work It Out" is a song by the English rock band the Beatles, written by Paul McCartney and John Lennon. It was first issued as a double A-side single with "Day Tripper" in December 1965. It also appeared on the 1966 US release Yesterday and Today. The release marked the first time in Britain that both tracks on an artist's single were promoted as joint A-sides. The song was recorded during the sessions for the band's Rubber Soul album. The single was number 1 in Britain (where it won the Ivor Novello Award for the top-selling A-side of 1965), the United States, Australia, Canada and Ireland. In the UK, it was the seventh highest selling single of the 1960s.

"We Can Work It Out" is a comparatively rare example of a Lennon–McCartney collaboration from this period in the Beatles' career, in that it recalls the level of collaboration the two songwriters had shared when writing the group's hit singles of 1963. This song, "A Day in the Life", "Baby, You're a Rich Man" and "I've Got a Feeling", are among the notable exceptions.

Composition

McCartney wrote the words and music to the verses and the chorus, with lyrics that "might have been personal", probably a reference to his relationship with Jane Asher. McCartney then took the song to Lennon, who contributed the middle 8:

With its intimations of mortality, Lennon's contribution to the twelve-bar bridge contrasts typically with what Lennon saw as McCartney's cajoling optimism, a contrast also seen in other collaborations by the pair, such as "Getting Better" and "I've Got a Feeling". As Lennon told Playboy in 1980:

In author Ian MacDonald's view, some critics have overemphasised the extent of McCartney's optimism in the song and neglect the toughness in passages written by McCartney, such as "Do I have to keep on talking until I can't go on?" Lennon's middle shifts focus from McCartney's concrete reality to a philosophical perspective in B minor, illustrating this with the waltz-like passage suggested by Harrison that leads back to the verse, possibly meant to suggest tiresome struggle. Rather than a formal change to  time, the waltz effect is created by the use of quarter note triplets within the regular  rhythm.

MacDonald comments on the song:

Recording

The Beatles recorded "We Can Work It Out" at EMI Studios (later Abbey Road Studios) in London on 20 October 1965, during the sessions for their Rubber Soul album. Along with Lennon's "Day Tripper", the song was earmarked for the non-album single that would accompany the release of the new LP. The band taped a satisfactory basic track in just two takes. With nearly eleven hours dedicated to the song, however, it was by far their longest expenditure of studio time up to that point. A vocal overdubbing session took place on 29 October.

No record exists of the band members' exact contributions to the recording, leading to uncertainty regarding the playing of some of the instruments. Reduced to a single track in the final mix, where it was placed hard left in the stereo image, the group's initial performance consisted of acoustic guitar, bass, tambourine and drums. While musicologist Walter Everett credits these parts to Lennon, McCartney, Harrison and Ringo Starr, respectively, authors Jean-Michel Guesdon and Philippe Margotin suggest that McCartney, as the song's main composer, was the acoustic guitarist and Lennon instead played bass. Two harmonium parts were overdubbed, using EMI's Mannborg harmonium.

Promotional films
For the first time for one of their singles, the Beatles filmed promotional clips for "We Can Work It Out" and "Day Tripper". Subsequently, known as the "Intertel Promos", these clips were intended as a way to save the band having to appear in person on popular British television shows such as Ready Steady Go! and Top of the Pops, and also ensured that the Beatles reached their large international audience.

Filming took place at Twickenham Film Studios in south-west London on 23 November 1965, with Joe McGrath as director. The Beatles made a total of ten black-and-white promos that day, filming clips for the new songs as well as for their previous hit singles "I Feel Fine", "Ticket to Ride" and "Help!" Three of the films were mimed performances of "We Can Work It Out", in all of which Lennon was seated at a harmonium.

The most frequently broadcast of the three was a straightforward performance piece with the group wearing black suits. In the description of Rolling Stone journalist Rob Sheffield: "At first, they're playing it all straight in their suits, until John sets out to make Paul crack up on camera. He makes it impossible for anyone else to keep a straight face – by the end, he's playing the organ with his feet." Another clip shows the group wearing the stage suits from their Shea Stadium performance on 15 August. The third clip opens with a still photograph of Lennon with a sunflower in front of his eye.

One of the November 1965 promo films was included in the Beatles' 2015 video compilation 1, and the third promo clip was included in the three-disc versions of the compilation, titled 1+.

Release
In a discussion about which of the two songs should be the A-side of the new single, Lennon had argued for "Day Tripper", differing with the majority view that "We Can Work It Out" was a more commercial song. On 15 November, EMI announced that the A-side would be "We Can Work It Out", only for Lennon to publicly contradict this two days later. As a result, the single was marketed as the first-ever "double A-side". Lennon's championing of "Day Tripper", for which he was the principal writer, was based on his belief that the Beatles' rock sound should be favoured over the softer style of "We Can Work It Out". Airplay and point-of-sale requests soon proved "We Can Work It Out" to be the more popular of the two sides.

The single was released on EMI's Parlophone label in Britain (as Parlophone R 5389) on 3 December 1965, the same day as Rubber Soul. The two releases coincided with speculation in the UK press that the Beatles' supremacy in the pop world since 1963 might be coming to an end, given the customary two or three years that most acts could expect to remain at the peak of their popularity. "Day Tripper" / "We Can Work It Out" entered the UK Singles Chart (at the time, the Record Retailer chart) on 15 December, at number 2, before holding the top position for five consecutive weeks. The single also failed to top the national chart published by Melody Maker in its first week – marking the first occasion since December 1963 that a new Beatles single had not immediately entered at number 1. Although the single was an immediate number 1 on the NMEs chart, the Daily Mirror and Daily Express newspapers both published articles highlighting the apparent decline. The record was the Beatles' ninth consecutive chart-topping single in the UK and the band's fastest-selling single there since "Can't Buy Me Love", their previous McCartney-led A-side. At the following year's Ivor Novello Awards, "We Can Work It Out" was acknowledged as the best-selling single of 1965, ahead of "Help!" By November 2012, it had sold 1.39 million copies in the UK, making it the group's fifth million-seller in that country. As of December 2018, the double A-side was the 54th best-selling single of all time in the UK – one of six Beatles songs included on the top sales rankings published by the Official Charts Company.

In the United States, where the single was issued by Capitol Records on 6 December (as Capitol 5555), both songs entered the Billboard Hot 100 on the week ending 18 December. On 8 January 1966, "We Can Work It Out" hit number 1 on the chart, while "Day Tripper" entered the top ten at number 10. "We Can Work It Out" spent three non-consecutive weeks at number 1, while "Day Tripper" peaked at number 5. The song was the band's eleventh US number 1, accomplished in just under two years since their debut on the Hot 100. It was their sixth consecutive number 1 single on the American charts, a record at the time. The single was certified gold by the Recording Industry Association of America, for sales of 1 million or over, on 6 January 1966.

Author Andrew Grant Jackson writes that the Beatles' six US chart-toppers over the year from January 1965 reflected the nation's changing mood with regard to the Vietnam War and youth-driven social upheaval. With "We Can Work It Out", he continues, the Beatles conveyed the "fussing and fighting" that had replaced the post-Kennedy rebirth from the start of the year. The song was referenced by Cecil Kellaway's character in the 1967 film Guess Who's Coming to Dinner, which focused on the then controversial issue of biracial relationships in the context of US civil rights.

The Beatles performed "We Can Work It Out" on their final UK tour, which took place on 3–12 December 1965. In 1991, McCartney played an acoustic version of the song for his MTV Unplugged performance, later released on Unplugged (The Official Bootleg), and The Unplugged Collection, Volume One.

Cover versions

Deep Purple

Deep Purple covered it on their second album The Book of Taliesyn, from 1968. The band drastically reworked it, as they always did with covers. The first three minutes of the song is a fast, progressive instrumental jam incorporating themes from classical music (notably Tchaikovsky's Romeo and Juliet) called "Exposition", which drifts over into the Beatles song.

Such overblown arrangements and attempts at making a rather simple song sound epic was normal for Deep Purple in this period, and they had already followed the same structure on their covers on the debut album (such as The Leaves' "Hey Joe"). Reportedly, the band recorded their version of the song because McCartney had stated that he was impressed with their previous Beatles cover, "Help!", which was featured on Shades of Deep Purple.

Stevie Wonder

In 1970, Stevie Wonder covered the song on his album Signed, Sealed & Delivered, and released it as a single in 1971. The single reached number 13 on the Billboard Hot 100. Wonder's version earned him his fifth Grammy Award nomination in 1972, for Best Male R&B Vocal Performance.  Cash Box described this version as a "spectacular dance track" which "returns Wonder to his earlier straight-ahead teen self complete with harmonica solo."

Wonder performed the song for McCartney after the latter was presented with a Grammy Lifetime Achievement Award in 1990. In 2010, after McCartney was awarded the Gershwin Prize by the Library of Congress, Wonder again performed his arrangement of "We Can Work It Out" at a White House ceremony held in McCartney's honour. Wonder performed it a third time in January 2014, at the 50th anniversary tribute of the Beatles' appearance on The Ed Sullivan Show.

Other artists
In his discussion of the various cover versions of "We Can Work It Out", John Kruth describes Petula Clark's recording, released on her 1966 album My Love, as "too perky for its own good". He highlights Humble Pie's blues version, from their 1975 album Street Rats, as a "bold" reading in which the band dispensed with the song's melody to fashion "a worried blues ... more Sonny Boy Williamson than Fab Four".

In 1976, the song was the Four Seasons' contribution to the soundtrack of All This and World War II, a musical documentary that author Nicholas Schaffner described as "the most bizarre" of several film and television works that capitalised on EMI, now free of its contractual obligations to the Beatles, flooding the market with re-packaged Beatles singles. Schaffner included this heavily orchestrated version, produced by Lou Reizner, among the interpretations that "[succeed] in making Lennon–McCartney's greatest songs sound, at best, like the Beatles' rendition of 'Good Night'". 

Other artists who have covered the song include Dionne Warwick, Valerie Simpson, Melanie, Chaka Khan, Maxine Brown, Brass Construction, King Missile, Johnny Mathis, Judy Collins, Big Youth, Tesla, Plain White T's, Tom Jones, Heather Nova, Steel Pulse, and Rick Wakeman.

Personnel
According to Walter Everett, the line-up of musicians on the Beatles' recording was as follows:

Paul McCartney – double-tracked lead vocal, bass guitar
John Lennon – harmony vocal, acoustic guitar, harmonium
George Harrison – tambourine
Ringo Starr – drums

In his personnel list for the song, MacDonald notes that some sources attribute the tambourine part to Harrison, yet he considers it more likely that Starr played the instrument. Everett credits Harrison, citing the tambourine's placement in the stereo image with the three other instruments recorded as part of the basic track. Guesdon and Margotin also credit Harrison.

Charts and certifications

Beatles version

Weekly charts

Year-end charts

Certifications

Stevie Wonder version

Weekly charts

Year-end charts

Notes

References

Sources

External links
 Full lyrics for the song at the Beatles' official website 
 

1965 songs
1965 singles
The Beatles songs
Parlophone singles
Capitol Records singles
Songs written by Lennon–McCartney
Song recordings produced by George Martin
Songs published by Northern Songs
Number-one singles in Australia
RPM Top Singles number-one singles
Irish Singles Chart number-one singles
Number-one singles in Norway
Number-one singles in Sweden
UK Singles Chart number-one singles
Billboard Hot 100 number-one singles
Cashbox number-one singles
Christmas number-one singles in the United Kingdom
1971 singles
Tamla Records singles
Stevie Wonder songs
Petula Clark songs
Deep Purple songs
Humble Pie (band) songs
The Four Seasons (band) songs
British folk rock songs